Rupert Thomas Webb (11 July 1922 – 27 August 2018) was an English cricketer who played first-class cricket for Sussex from 1948 to 1960. He was born in Harrow, Middlesex.

Webb was Sussex's regular wicketkeeper between 1950 and 1958. In all, he played in 255 first-class matches for the county, plus one for the Marylebone Cricket Club in 1959 when he was no longer playing regularly for Sussex.

References

1922 births
2018 deaths
English cricketers
Sussex cricketers
Marylebone Cricket Club cricketers
Wicket-keepers
People from Harrow, London